The Temple of Aesculapius located in the gardens of the Villa Borghese, in Rome, was built in the ionic style between 1785 and 1792 by Antonio Asprucci and his son Mario Asprucci, with help from Cristoforo Unterperger. The temple was perhaps built in memory of the destroyed ancient temple to the god of Medicine on the Tiber Island.

The temple houses a statue of Aesculapius, believed to be originally from the Mausoleum of Augustus. Neglected over the centuries, it was restored by Vincenzo Pacetti and sold to Marcantonio Borghese IV in 1785.

See also
List of Ancient Roman temples

References

Further reading

External links 

Villa Borghese
Religious buildings and structures completed in 1792
Buildings and structures in Rome
Tourist attractions in Rome
Temples in Rome